The Rural Municipality of Ituna Bon Accord No. 246 is a rural municipality (RM) in the Canadian province of Saskatchewan within Census Division No. 10 and  Division No. 4.

History 
The RM of Ituna Bon Accord No. 246 incorporated as a rural municipality on January 1, 1913.

Geography

Communities and localities 
The following urban municipalities are surrounded by the RM.

Towns
 Ituna

Villages
 Hubbard

The following unincorporated communities are within the RM.

Localities
 Jasmin

Demographics 

Ituna & District Regional Park 
The park, which was founded in 1966, has a 9-hole golf course, campground, junior Olympic-size swimming pool, 18-hole disc golf, beach volleyball, and baseball diamonds.

The campground has 19 campsites with electric hookups and eight non-electric. All campsites have picnic tables, barbecues, access to potable water, and modern washrooms and showers, which are available in the swimming pool building.

The golf course has two artificial greens and nine sand greens. It is a par 34 with 2,335 total yards.

Government 
The RM of Ituna Bon Accord No. 246 is governed by an elected municipal council and an appointed administrator that meets on the second Tuesday of every month. The reeve of the RM is Edward Datchko while its administrator is Wilma Hrenyk. The RM's office is located in Ituna.

Transportation 
 Saskatchewan Highway 15
 Saskatchewan Highway 52
 Saskatchewan Highway 310
 Saskatchewan Highway 731
 Canadian National Railway
 Ituna Airport

See also 
List of rural municipalities in Saskatchewan

References

External links 
Ituna & District Regional Park

I

Division No. 10, Saskatchewan